Etna, Ohio may refer to:
 Etna, Lawrence County, Ohio
 Etna, Licking County, Ohio
 Etna Township, Licking County, Ohio